John Impey (died 1829) was an English legal writer. He was inducted into the Middle Temple on 4 November 1771 and remained a member for sixty years.

Selected works 
Source:
Duties in the Office under Sheriff, their Deputies, and also the Duty of the Coroner. (1786)
The Modern Pleaner (1786)
The New Instructor Clericalis, stating the Authority, Jurisdiction, and Practice of the Court of King's Bench,' London, 1782, 8vo; it reached a tenth edition in the author's lifetime (1823).

References 

Year of birth unknown
1829 deaths
English legal writers
19th-century English non-fiction writers
English male non-fiction writers
19th-century male writers